Blauvac is a commune in the Vaucluse department in the Provence-Alpes-Côte d'Azur region in southeastern France.

Notable people
Georges Hugon (23 July 1904 – 19 June 1980), French composer, died in Blauvac

See also
Communes of the Vaucluse department

References

Communes of Vaucluse